Kettlewell with Starbotton is a civil parish in the Craven district of North Yorkshire, England.

Kettlewell is a village in Upper Wharfedale, North Yorkshire, England. It lies between the villages of Grassington, Kilnsey and Conistone to the south, Starbotton to the north-west, the hamlet of Horsehouse to the north-east, and later on Coverdale. Kettlewell nestles at the feet of Great Whernside, and Buckden Pike,  where Park Gill Beck joins the River Wharfe, and set to the east of the Wharfe.  Both river and beck are joined by attractive stone bridges there.

Starbotton is a hamlet of around 70 houses  situated in the Yorkshire Dales National Park, by the River Wharfe in Wharfedale. The resident population is only around 75 with many of the village houses being used as holiday accommodation. There are only two remaining working farms - one at either end of the village, the rest having been converted in one way or another. It is on the opposite bank of the River Wharfe to the Dales Way halfway between Kettlewell and Buckden.

References

Wharfedale
Craven District
Civil parishes in North Yorkshire